Holloway-Walker-Dollarhite House is a historic home located near Bethel Hill, Person County, North Carolina.  It consists of a -story block with a shed addition and Georgian details dated to the late-18th century; a two-story, mid-19th century central block with Greek Revival style trim; and a -story, early-19th century section moved to the property in 1976. The early-19th century section is connected to the main block by a modern addition.

The house was added to the National Register of Historic Places in 1982.

References

Houses on the National Register of Historic Places in North Carolina
Georgian architecture in North Carolina
Greek Revival houses in North Carolina
Houses in Person County, North Carolina
National Register of Historic Places in Person County, North Carolina